A magnitude 5.7 earthquake struck India  east north-east of Ambassa in the state of Tripura on 3 January 2017 with a maximum observed intensity of 6-7 EMS. It struck at 2:39 pm local time (09:09 UTC), and was centered in an isolated area. The estimated depth was 32.0 km.

One person died and five others were injured in India. At least 50 houses were damaged due to landslides that occurred in Dhalai district, while roads were blocked after trees were uprooted. According to the Tripura State Disaster Management Authority, at least 6,727 buildings were damaged in Tripura in the districts of Dhalai and Unakoti. Shaking was felt in many parts of north-eastern India including as far as Kolkata. The tremor was also felt in neighboring Bangladesh, where two people died and three others were injured. The earthquake caused liquefaction on the banks of the Manu river in Tripura and along the Dhalai river in adjacent parts of Bangladesh, in particular in the Kamalganj area.

See also
 List of earthquakes in 2017
 List of earthquakes in India
 List of earthquakes in Bangladesh

References

External links

2017 earthquakes
2017 in Bangladesh
2017 disasters in India
Disasters in Tripura
Earthquakes in Bangladesh
Earthquakes in India
January 2017 events in Asia
History of Tripura (1947–present)
Kamalganj Upazila
January 2017 events in India
January 2017 events in Bangladesh